The 1993–94 Azadegan League was the third season of the Azadegan League that was won by Saipa.

 Iranian Football Champions: Saipa
 Relegated teams           : _
 Promoted teams            :Esteghlal, Machine Sazi, Shahdari Sari, Naft Ghaemshahr, Bank Tejarat, Payam Gach Khorasan, Pars Khodro, Ararat, Qods Sari, Shahin Bushehr

Top goal scorer
 Abbas Simakani (Zob Ahan) (17 goals)

References 
 

Azadegan League seasons
Iran
1993–94 in Iranian football